William Montagu may refer to:

William Montagu, 2nd Baron Montagu (c. 1285–1319), English peer, soldier and courtier
William Montagu, 1st Earl of Salisbury (1301–1344), English nobleman
William de Montagu, 2nd Earl of Salisbury (1328–1397)
William Montagu, 2nd Duke of Manchester (1700–1739)
William Montagu, 5th Duke of Manchester (1771–1843), British peer, soldier, colonial administrator and politician
William Montagu, 7th Duke of Manchester (1823–1890), British peer and Member of Parliament
William Montagu, 9th Duke of Manchester (1877–1947), British peer and politician
William Montagu (younger) (1652–1691), English MP for Midhurst and Stockbridge, imprisoned for debt
William Montagu (judge) (1618–1706), British judge
William Montagu (MP) (c. 1720–1757), British politician for Huntingdonshire and Bossiney
William Augustus Montagu (c. 1785–1852), British military officer
William Augustus Montagu (MP) (1752–1776), British politician
William Montagu Manning (1811–1895), Australian politician

See also
William Pepperell Montague (1873–1953), philosopher
William Montacute (disambiguation)
Montagu Williams (1835–1892), English teacher, soldier, playwright, barrister and magistrate